The Portuguese Journal of Social Science is a triannual peer-reviewed academic journal published by ISCTE – Lisbon University Institute. It covers research by Portuguese scholars or which concerns Portugal or is being conducted as part of a project involving Portuguese institutions and organizations. Preference is given to the publication of original work, although the journal may publish exceptional work that has previously been published in languages other than English.

External links 
 

European studies journals
Publications established in 2002
English-language journals
2002 establishments in Portugal
Triannual journals